The human flea (Pulex irritans) – once also called the house flea – is a cosmopolitan flea species that has, in spite of the common name, a wide host spectrum. It is one of six species in the genus Pulex; the other five are all confined to the Nearctic and Neotropical realms. The species is thought to have originated in South America, where its original host may have been the guinea pig or peccary.

Morphology and behavior

Pulex irritans is a holometabolous insect with a four-part lifecycle consisting of eggs, larvae, pupae, and adults. Eggs are shed by the female in the environment and hatch into larvae in about 3–4 days. Larvae feed on organic debris in the environment. Larvae eventually form pupae, which are in cocoons that are often covered with debris from the environment (sand, pebbles, etc.). The larval and pupal stages are completed in about 3–4 weeks when the adults hatch from pupae, then must seek out a warm-blooded host for blood meals.

The flea eggs are about 0.5 mm in length. They are oval-shaped and pearly white in color. Eggs are often laid on the body of the host, but they often fall off in many different places.
The larvae are about 0.6 mm in length. They are creamy white or yellow in color. Larvae have 13 segments with bristles on each segment. The larvae feed on a variety of organic debris.
The pupa are around 4 x 2 mm. After undergoing three separate molts, the larvae pupate, then emerge as adults. If conditions are unfavorable, a cocooned flea can remain dormant for up to a year in the pupal phase.     
The adults are roughly 1.5 to 4 mm in length and are laterally flattened. They are dark brown in color, are wingless, and have piercing-sucking mouthparts that aid in feeding on the host's blood. Both genal and pronotal combs are absent and the adult flea has a rounded head. Most fleas are distributed in the egg, larval, or pupal stages.

Relationship with host

Direct effects of bites 

Fleas are a pest species to their hosts, causing an itching sensation that results in discomfort and leads to scratching in the vicinity of the bite. Flea bites generally cause the skin to raise, swell, and itch. The bite site has a single puncture point in the center. Bites often appear in clusters or small rows and can remain inflamed for up to several weeks.

This species bites many species of mammals and birds, including domesticated ones. It has been found on dogs and wild canids, monkeys in captivity, opossums, domestic cats, wild felids in captivity, chickens, black rats and Norwegian rats, wild rodents, pigs, free-tailed bats, and other species. It can also be an intermediate host for the flea tapeworm cestode Dipylidium caninum.

Fleas can spread rapidly and move between areas to include eyebrows, eyelashes, and pubic regions.

Hair loss as a result of itching is common, especially in wild and domestic animals. 
Anemia is also possible in extreme cases of high-volume infestations.

Vector capabilities
Plague, a disease that affects humans and other mammals, is caused by the bacterium Yersinia pestis. The human flea can be a carrier of the plague bacterium. Plague is infamous for killing millions of people in Eurasia during the Middle Ages. Without prompt treatment, the disease can cause serious illness or death. Today, human plague infections continue to occur in the western United States, but significantly more cases occur in parts of Africa and Asia.

Plague is a very serious illness, but is treatable with commonly available antibiotics. The earlier a patient seeks medical care and receives treatment that is appropriate for plague, the better their chances are of a full recovery.

People in close contact with very sick pneumonic plague patients may be evaluated and possibly placed under observation. Preventive antibiotic therapy may also be given, depending on the type and timing of personal contact.

Treatment and prevention
Common treatments include body shaving and medicated shampoos and combing. When preventing fleas, it is important to treat both the host and the environment. Household pets should be treated to prevent being infested. Carpets, and other floor surfaces, should be shampooed and vacuumed regularly to prevent fleas. When dealing with an infestation, bedding and clothing that may have been exposed should be washed thoroughly in hot water and kept away from other materials that have not been exposed. In extreme cases, extermination by a professional is necessary.

Phylogeny and Distribution 
Pulex irritans originated in Central and South America, where it evolved with only one host. Despite the origins of P. irritans, it is now a cosmopolitan species, most likely due to the fur trade after the 18th century, and pet transport in more recent decades. Due to the cosmopolitan distribution of this group, research has been conducted to show that P. irritans individuals, when sampled from Spain and Argentina, only showed significant differences when comparing molecular data. The use of morphometric data, which is often the method for flea identification, showed no significant levels of divergence between the two populations. Combining both morphological and molecular data has identified the possibility of cryptic species. This indicates a need to reconsider taxonomic classifications of these fleas. Studies in Europe and the Mediterranean also found this to be true. Human and cat fleas from Europe and the Mediterranean were studied and show such great variation within their own species that their taxonomy should be reevaluated based on mitochondrial gene heterogeneity.

References

Pulicidae
Insects described in 1758
Taxa named by Carl Linnaeus
Parasitic arthropods of humans